The South Africa women's national soccer team, nicknamed Banyana Banyana (The Girls), is the national team of South Africa and is controlled by the South African Football Association.

Their first official match was held on 30 May 1993 against Swaziland.

They qualified for Olympic football for the first time in 2012, and for a FIFA Women's World Cup for the first time in 2019, in Group B with Germany, Spain and China. However, they lost all matches, and their only goal was against Spain when they went to a 1–0 lead only to lose 3–1. South Africa won their first Women's Africa Cup of Nations in 2022, beating Morocco 2–1 in the final.

History

Team image

Nicknames
The South Africa women's national football team has been known or nicknamed as the "Banyana Banyana", which literally means "Girls Girls". This name is derived from the Senior Men's National team being "Bafana Bafana".

Results and fixtures
The following is a list of match results in the last 12 months, as well as any future matches that have been scheduled.

Legend

2022

2023

Source: Global Sports Archive

Coaching staff

Current coaching staff

Technical staff

Manager history

  Sandile Bali (1995)
  Nomaluno Mooi (1998)
  Fran Hilton-Smith (2000)
  Greg Mashilo (2002–2004)
  August Makalakalane (2006–2011)
  Joseph Mkhonza (2011–2014)
  Vera Pauw (2014–2016)
  Desiree Ellis (2016–present)

Players

Current squad
 This is the final Squad was announced on 6 February 2023   for 2023 Turkish Women's Cup.
 Caps and goals accurate up to and including day month year.

Recent call ups
 The following players have been called up to a South Africa squad in the past 12 months.

Previous squads
FIFA Women's World Cup
 2019 FIFA Women's World Cup squad
Summer Olympics
 2012 Summer Olympics squad
 2016 Summer Olympics squad
Africa Women Cup of Nations
2000 African Women's Championship squad
2010 African Women's Championship squad
2012 African Women's Championship squad
2014 African Women's Championship squad
2016 Africa Women Cup of Nations squad
2018 Africa Women Cup of Nations squad
2022 Africa Women Cup of Nations squad
COSAFA Women's Championship
 2020 COSAFA Women's Championship squad
 2021 COSAFA Women's Championship squad
 2022 COSAFA Women's Championship squad
Turkish Women's Cup
2023 Turkish Women's Cup squads

Records

 Active players in bold, statistics correct as of 2020.

Most capped players

Top goalscorers

Honours

Continental
Africa Women Cup of Nations
  Champions: 2022
  Runners-up: 1995, 2000, 2008, 2012, 2018
  Third place: 2006, 2010

African Games
  Runners-up: 2003, 2007

Regional
COSAFA Women's Championship
  Champions: 2002, 2006, 2008, 2017, 2018, 2019, 2020
  Runners-up: 2011

Competitive record

FIFA Women's World Cup

*Draws include knockout matches decided on penalty kicks.

Olympic Games

*Draws include knockout matches decided on penalty kicks.

Africa Women Cup of Nations

*Draws include knockout matches decided on penalty kicks.

African Games

COSAFA Women's Championship

*Draws include knockout matches decided on penalty kicks.

All−time record against FIFA recognized nations
The list shown below shows the women's South Africa national soccer team's all−time international record against opposing nations.
*As of xxxxxx after match against  xxxx.
Key

Record per opponent
*As ofxxxxx after match against  xxxxx.
Key

The following table shows South Africa's all-time official international record per opponent:

See also

 Sport in South Africa
 Football in South Africa
 Women's football in South Africa
 National teams
 South Africa women's national football team
 South Africa women's national football team results
 South Africa women's national under-20 soccer team
 South Africa women's national under-17 soccer team

References

External links
Official website
FIFA profile

 
African women's national association football teams